Alan Jenkins (born 1955) is an English poet.

Life
Jenkins was born in Kingston upon Thames, Surrey, brought up on the outskirts of London in Richmond, and educated at the University of Sussex. He has worked for The Times Literary Supplement since 1980, first as poetry and fiction editor, and then as deputy editor.  He was also a poetry critic for The Observer, and the Sunday Independent from 1985 to 1990. He edited Essential Reading: Selected Poems of Peter Reading, 1986, and  Collected Poems of Ian Hamilton, 2009.

He has taught creative writing for the Bread Loaf Writers' Conference, Arvon Foundation, the Poetry Society, London, and at the American University in Paris.  He was a judge for the Christopher Tower Poetry Prizes. From 2015 to 2018 he was Poet in Residence at St. John's College, University of Cambridge.

Awards
 1981 Eric Gregory Award
 1994 Forward Poetry Prize, for Harm
 2000 shortlisted for the T. S. Eliot Prize, Poetry Book Society Choice, for The Drift
 2005 shortlisted for the Forward Poetry Prize, for A Shorter Life
 2006 Cholmondeley Award

Works

Poetry

References

External links
 "Alan Jenkins", The British Council.
 David Harrolsson, "The Poetry of Alan Jenkins", Parameter Magazine

British poets
People from Kingston upon Thames
1955 births
Alumni of the University of Sussex
Fellows of the Royal Society of Literature
Living people
British male poets